Bela is a village in Kasaragod taluk of Kasaragod district in Indian state of Kerala.

Location
Bela is located 13 km north east of Kasaragod town, 13 km south east of Kumbla and 5 km away from Badiyadka via Cherkala-Kalladka road.

Demographics
As of 2011 Census, Bela village had population of 11,144 of which 5,445 are males and 5,699 are females. The sex ratio of Bela was 1,047 lower than state average of 1,084. The population of children below 6 years was 10.6%. Bela had overall literacy of 87.6% lower than state average of 94 %. The male literacy stands at 91.8% and female literacy at 83.6%.

Administration
Bela village is a part of Badiyadka Grama Panchayat in Kasaragod Block Panchayat. Bela is politically a part of Kasaragod Assembly constituency under Kasaragod (Lok Sabha constituency).

References

Suburbs of Kasaragod